Anselo Lee is a 1915 American silent drama film directed by Harry Handworth and starring Antonio Moreno, Naomi Childers and Donald Hall.

Plot

Cast
 Antonio Moreno as Anselo Lee
 Naomi Childers as Gertrude Carlton
 Donald Hall as Van Buren
 Nellie Anderson as Old Mrs. Lee
 Billie Billings as Mrs. Carlton
 Frankie Mann

References

Bibliography
 George A. Katchmer. Eighty Silent Film Stars: Biographies and Filmographies of the Obscure to the Well Known. McFarland, 1991.

External links
 

1915 films
1915 drama films
1910s English-language films
American silent feature films
Silent American drama films
American black-and-white films
Films directed by Harry Handworth
Vitagraph Studios films
1910s American films